William R. Griffith House, also known as Cathedral House and Cathedral House of St. Stephen's Episcopal Cathedral, is a historic home located at Harrisburg, Dauphin County, Pennsylvania.  It was built between 1840 and 1843, and is a three-story, three-bay wide brick dwelling in the Greek Revival style.  The front block measures 28 feet by 40 feet, with a narrower rear block measuring 15 feet by 50 feet.  It features a front portico with freestanding Ionic order columns.

It was added to the National Register of Historic Places in 1976.

References

External links

Buildings and structures in Harrisburg, Pennsylvania
Houses on the National Register of Historic Places in Pennsylvania
Historic American Buildings Survey in Pennsylvania
Greek Revival houses in Pennsylvania
Houses completed in 1843
Houses in Dauphin County, Pennsylvania
1843 establishments in Pennsylvania
National Register of Historic Places in Harrisburg, Pennsylvania